William Alves de Oliveira (born 7 December 1991) is a Brazilian footballer who plays as a forward.

Club career

Botafogo
William Alves started off career in known Brazilian club Botafogo. He made his debut for Botafogo in Copa Sudamericana match against Colombian Independiente Santa Fe. In this match William netted the equalizing goal. The match ended in a 1–1 draw.

AS Trenčín
He came to AS Trenčín in winter 2012-2013 and signed three and half year contract. He made his debut for AS Trenčín in a friendly match against Czech SFC Opava on 26 January 2013. On 2 March 2013, he made his competitive debut for Trenčín in the league game against Spartak Myjava, when he came on in 77th minute. In winter 2013–2014, he left the club due to a disagreement between AS Trenčín and Botafogo.

MŠK Žilina
William Alves signed a three-year contract with fellow Corgoň liga club MŠK Žilina in January 2014. On 1 March, he scored a goal on his competitive debut for Žilina in a 2-1 league loss to his former club AS Trenčín. On 6 August 2015 he scored a 120th-minute goal against FC Vorskla that allowed Žilina to reach the play-off rounds of Europa League. Two weeks later, William scored a brace against Athletic Bilbao in the first leg of the Europa League play-off round, which Žilina won 3-2 after having been 2-0 down.

Kayserispor
In January 2016, William Alves was transferred to Turkish club Kayserispor.

References

External links

Data2.7m Profile

1991 births
Living people
Association football forwards
Brazilian footballers
Brazilian expatriate footballers
Botafogo de Futebol e Regatas players
AS Trenčín players
MŠK Žilina players
Kayserispor footballers
Slovak Super Liga players
G.D. Chaves players
Al-Faisaly FC players
Al-Fayha FC players
Primeira Liga players
Saudi Professional League players
Saudi First Division League players
Expatriate footballers in Slovakia
Expatriate footballers in Turkey
Expatriate footballers in Portugal
Expatriate footballers in Saudi Arabia
Brazilian expatriate sportspeople in Slovakia
Brazilian expatriate sportspeople in Turkey
Brazilian expatriate sportspeople in Portugal
Brazilian expatriate sportspeople in Saudi Arabia
People from Juiz de Fora
Sportspeople from Minas Gerais